Ash Dixon (born 1 September 1988) is a New Zealand rugby union player, who currently plays as a hooker for Green Rockets Tokatsu in the Japan Rugby League One.

Early career 
Dixon was a 2006 New Zealand Secondary Schools representative and Canterbury age-group rep through to Under-19 level. He has won the 2007 Under 19 Rugby World Championship with the New Zealand Under-19 team as well as the 2008 IRB Junior World Championship with the New Zealand Under-20s.

Senior career 
After being a part of the  Wider Training Group in 2010, Dixon was then promoted to the senior side for the 2011 Super Rugby season, but didn't play for the franchise.

In 2012, Dixon moved back to  ahead of the 2012 ITM Cup season, and some solid displays for the Magpies saw him named in the  Wider Training Group for the 2013 Super Rugby season.  He made his Super Rugby debut on 15 March 2013 against the Highlanders. He ended up playing 9 games for the Hurricanes that season and in October 2013, he was named in the Hurricanes squad for the 2014 season.

He was first named in the Highlanders squad for the 2015 Super Rugby season and played 7 seasons for the southern franchise. He was part of the Highlanders squad that won the 2015 Super Rugby title, defeating the  21–14 in the final.

On 12 August 2021, the  announced that Dixon would be leaving the franchise, having played exactly 100 games for them, to take up a two-year contract in Japan. The same day, Japanese club Green Rockets Tokatsu, which competes in the Japan Rugby League One competition, announced that Dixon would be joining the club.

New Zealand Māori 
On 25 October 2016 Dixon was named Captain of the New Zealand Māori for their Northern hemisphere tour. Ahead of their game against Munster in Thomond Park in Limerick, he presented a Māori jersey with the initials of the recently deceased Anthony Foley to Foley's sons.

In 2020, Dixon was awarded the Tom French Cup for Māori rugby player of the year.

Career honours

Highlanders

Super Rugby - 2015

Hawke's Bay

ITM Cup Championship - 2015
Mitre 10 Cup Championship - 2020

References

External links
 New Zealand Rugby History profile
 Ash Dixon itsrugby.co.uk Player Statistics

Living people
1988 births
People educated at Christchurch Boys' High School
New Zealand rugby union players
New Zealand Māori rugby union players
Rugby union players from Christchurch
Rugby union hookers
Auckland rugby union players
Hurricanes (rugby union) players
Highlanders (rugby union) players
Hawke's Bay rugby union players
Māori All Blacks players
Saitama Wild Knights players
Green Rockets Tokatsu players